Gilman Lika (born 31 January 1987) is an Albanian professional footballer who plays as a midfielder for  Vllaznia Shkodër in the Albanian Superliga and the Albania national team.

Having started his career with Vllaznia Shkodër in 2004, he moved to Turkey in 2008 where he played for Hacettepe, Boluspor and Diyarbakırspor before returning to Albania to play for Tirana. He then had a brief stint in Saudi Arabia with Al-Faisaly before returning to Albania once again to play for Flamurtari Vlorë and Vllaznia Shkodër, before returning to Tirana in July 2015.

A full international for Albania since 2008, Lika has earned over 15 caps for his country. He has also represented U-19 and U-21 side.

Club career

Early career
Born in Shkodër, Lika started his playing career with Vllaznia Shkodër. After years working up the ranks at the club, Lika finally made his breakthrough during the 2005–06 season at the age of just 18. He made his debut in the Albanian Superliga against Lushnja on 18 September 2005 in a 1–3 win; he came on as a substitute on the 89th minute. During that season Lika managed to play 28 games. His first goal came against Dinamo Tirana on 29 April 2006. Lika came on as a substitute in the 46th minute and his goal came in the 86th minute. During his years at Vllaznia Shkodër, Lika produced many great performances and in total he played 77 games and scored 14 goals in the Albanian Superliga.

Turkey
Along with fellow Vllaznia Shkodër players Admir Teli and Xhevahir Sukaj, he moved to the Turkish side Hacettepe Spor Kulübü on 4 August 2008. After joining the club Lika managed to make it into the starting lineup. During his time at Hacettepe, Lika played 24 matches and has scored two goals, being one of the valuable players of the team, which finished the 2008–09 season in the last position.

After leaving Hacettepe Spor Kulübü, Lika signed with fellow Turkish side Boluspor in August 2009. He scored two goals in his debut match against Mersin İdmanyurdu on 23 August, helping the team to win match 2–1. This was followed by another goal in the 2–1 away defeat to Çaykur Rizespor, which made temporarily him the TFF First League top goalscorer.

After a year at Boluspor, Lika was transferred to Diyarbakırspor.

Tirana
Lika returned to Albania following a two and a half year absence in January 2011, signing a two-year contract with Tirana. His Tirana debut came on 31 January 2011 against Dinamo Tirana in the Tirana derby, where Lika helped his side to a 2–1 win.

On 7 November 2012, in the returning leg of 2012–13 Albanian Cup's second round against Kukësi, Lika produced a Man of the Match performance by providing two assists and scoring a goal in an eventual 3–2 home win, which was not enough as Tirana was eliminated with the aggregate 6–3, losing the first leg 4–0. However, after the match it was reported that Lika suffered an ankle injury in his left leg.

On 7 April 2013, Lika scored an amazing free kick against Skënderbeu Korçë, which proved to be the winner as Tirana won the match 1–0 at Qemal Stafa Stadium.

Flamurtari Vlorë
On 1 February 2014, Lika completed a transfer to Flamurtari Vlorë as a free agent by signing a four-month contract worth €50,000. He made his competitive debut a day later in the goalless draw against Bylis Ballsh, playing the entire second half. His first score-sheet contributions came in his fourth appearance for the club on 22 February, starting and scoring an opener in an eventual 2–3 away defeat at Kukësi. During the match he was involved in an incident with the home crowd, provoking them after scoring the first goal of the match. Lika defended himself by saying: "I understand that I might have exaggerated, but everything has a reason. I want to tell with the biggest sincerity that during the match Kukësi fans insolted me with the lowest insults ever. That's why I reacted like this after I scored the goal." He scored his second goal of the season one month later exactly against the same opponent, in another away defeat, this time 4–2, as Lika scored the match's last goal. Lika finished the second part of the season by making 16 league appearances, scoring twice in the process, as Flamurtari finished the season in the 7th position. He was also an important instrument in team's success in cup, making 5 appearances, including a full-90 minute in the final, as the team defeated Kukësi at Qemal Stafa Stadium to save the season, securing a spot in 2014–15 UEFA Europa League first qualifying round.

In June 2014, it was confirmed that Lika would stay at the club for the upcoming season. He was included in the Europa League squad, and played his first match of the season on 3 July in the away tie against Sioni Bolnisi, scoring the winner in the last minute of added time to reward his team with a 3–2 win. He also played in the returning leg as Flamurtari went through thanks to away goal rule. On 5 January 2015, Lika terminated his contract with the club after 11 months, becoming a free agent in the process.

Vllaznia Shkodër
On 23 January 2015, Lika agreed terms with his first club Vllaznia Shkodër to return to his hometown club following a six-year absence, signing a six-month contract. He made his debut one week later, starting and playing the full 90 minutes in a 2–1 upset against Teuta Durrës at Niko Dovana Stadium. On 8 February, Lika played for the first time in Loro Boriçi Stadium as an Vllaznia player after six years absence, starting again and playing 90 minutes in another defeat, this time against his former employer Tirana. Lika scored his first goal for Vllaznia after his return, and also his first goal of 2014–15 season, in a 2–0 home win over Apolonia Fier.

During February he made his Albanian Cup debut as well, playing 90 minutes in a two-legged match against FK Kukësi, who advanced to the next round with the aggregate 2–0. On 18 April, during the league match against his former team Flamurtari Vlorë, Lika scored a free-kick in the 59th minute to help the team to leave the stadium with one point. He scored his third goal of the season again by free-kick, this time in a 1–1 draw against Elbasani at the neutral ground Gjorgji Kyçyku Stadium.

Vllaznia ended the season in the seventh place with 35 points, running out of objectives. In individual aspect, Lika ended the second part of the season with Vllaznia by playing 19 matches in all competitions, including 17 in Albanian Superliga, and scored two goals. His good performances attracted the attention of capital clubs, Tirana and Partizani. Lika left the club on 1 July after his contract expired, being a free agent. During an interview, Lika said that he left Vllaznia because of "difficult situation of the club", adding that "every player in his place would do the same thing".

Return to Tirana
On 6 July 2015, Lika returned to Tirana after three seasons absence, signing a one-year contract. Before the transfer, the media's started to speculating that Lika will not move to Tirana if the capital club will not pay more than half of the €30,000 debt that the club had not paid during the last time that Lika was part of Tirana. During his presentation in Thursday, Lika said that "Tirana is his second home after Shkodra", by adding that "with this return, he felt like he's returning home".

He made his return debut in the season away opener, scoring in a 2–1 win over newly promoted side Tërbuni Pukë. He scored his second of the season against the same opponents later on 7 November, giving the team its second consecutive league win. Lika finished his return season by making 33 league appearances, in addition 5 cup matches, scoring 3 times, including 1 in cup, as Tirana finished the season in the 5th position, remaining out of European competitions for the fourth consecutive year, collecting 53 points, 18 less the last season.

On 17 July 2016, he was included in team's summer training camp in Zlatibor, Slovenia, but was forced to return early in Albania due to an injury. On 24 May of the following year, Lika requested not to play in the final matchday against his boyhood club Vllaznia, stating that he was not going to put Vllaznia in danger, who risked relegation along with Tirana. He became the third player to do so after Elis Bakaj and Endrit Vrapi, who both refused to play against Tirana. His request was accepted by club president Refik Halili. Tirana didn't go more than a goalless draw and was eventually relegated to Albanian First Division for the first time in history, leaving Vllaznia as the only club never to be relegated.

On 31 May, in the Albanian Cup final against Skënderbeu Korçë, Lika played the whole match as Tirana won 3–1 at extra-time after the regular time ended in a 1–1, winning the 16th Albanian Cup in history, 5th in Lika's career, becoming the most successful club. Following the end of season, Lika's contract ended, and he decided not to extend it.

Second Vllaznia Shkodër return
On 3 August 2017, Lika reached an agreement with Vllaznia, signing a 1+1 contract, returning in Shkodër for a second time. He was presented one day later, and was handed squad number 19. He was named new captain following the departure of Ndriçim Shtubina and made his third debut on 17 September in the 0–1 home loss to Teuta Durrës. He opened his scoring account on 22 November by netting the opener against the bottom side Lushnja in an eventual 2–1 home win, the first after 9 matches. Lika was on the score-sheet four days later as he netted a late winner against the other relegation strugglers Luftëtari Gjirokastër to give his side another three points and the second consecutive league win.

International career
Lika had played for Albania under-21 since making his debut on 11 October 2005 in a match against Turkey. The match ended in a draw and although Lika started on his debut, he was subbed off in the 55th minute. He has nine appearances for under-21 side since from 2005 to 2008. Lika has also played for Albania U-19, although he only played 4 games during 23 October 2005 and 27 October 2005.

Lika made his senior international debut in a friendly against Azerbaijan on 19 November 2008 following a call up by Arie Haan. He was a 73rd-minute substitute for Klodian Duro in the 1-1 draw. His first competitive cap came just a few months later against Malta where he started the game on the left of the five man midfield and helped his side to a goal less draw.

Career statistics

Club
>

International

Honours

Club
Vllaznia Shkodër
Albanian Cup: 2007–08

Tirana
Albanian Cup: 2010–11, 2011–12,  2016–17
Albanian Supercup: 2011, 2012

Flamurtari Vlorë
Albanian Cup: 2013–14

Individual
Albanian Superliga Player of the Month: September 2011

References

External links

 
 
 
 

1987 births
Living people
Footballers from Shkodër
Albanian footballers
Association football midfielders
Albania international footballers
KF Vllaznia Shkodër players
Hacettepe S.K. footballers
Boluspor footballers
Diyarbakırspor footballers
KF Tirana players
Al-Faisaly FC players
Flamurtari Vlorë players
Kategoria Superiore players
Süper Lig players
Saudi Professional League players
Albanian expatriate footballers
Expatriate footballers in Turkey
Albanian expatriate sportspeople in Turkey
Expatriate footballers in Saudi Arabia
Albanian expatriate sportspeople in Saudi Arabia